François de Labat (1697–1780) was a French economist.

1697 births
1780 deaths
French economists